Blaž Črešnar (born July 14, 1986 in Maribor, SFR Yugoslavia) is a Slovenian professional basketball player. He is a 2.16 m (7 ft 1 in) tall center.

External links
 
 Blaž Črešnar at RealGM.com
 
 

1986 births
Living people
Basket Zaragoza players
BSC Fürstenfeld Panthers players
Centers (basketball)
FIBA 3x3 World Tour players
KK Olimpija players
Lugano Tigers players
Slovenian expatriate basketball people in Spain
Slovenian expatriate sportspeople in Switzerland
Slovenian men's basketball players
Slovenian 3x3 basketball players
Sportspeople from Maribor